George Hay Morgan (1866 – 24 January 1931) was a British Liberal Party politician.

Background
He was born in the town of Hay-on-Wye, Breconshire, in 1866. This is where his middle name came from. He was the son of Walter and Ann Morgan, of Wernwilk House, Hay-on-Wye. He studied at Pontypool College, University College Cardiff and the University of London. He married Margaret Jane Lewis of Pontnewynydd, Monmouthshire.

Career
He was part of the Baptist Ministry in North London. From 1890 to 1900 he was in charge of the Baptist Church, Woodberry Down, London. He was a Barrister-at-law and was later admitted to the Bar.

Political career
In Wales, he was an active member of the Liberal Party and also a member of the Welsh Nationalist Cymru Fydd. 
From 1897 to 1900 he was a member of the Tottenham School Board. At the 1900 general election he stood unsuccessfully as Liberal candidate for Tottenham.

He was elected Liberal MP for Truro in the Liberal landslide of 1906 replacing the Liberal Unionist MP Edwin Durning-Lawrence.

Although Truro had been a Unionist seat Morgan, as a Baptist preacher, was able to attract the Methodist vote by preaching in the constituency's principal chapels. Morgan also justified his right to represent the Truro seat in Cornwall 'because he was a Cornishman, a Celt, and he ...belonged to the same stock, of the same blood line'. Morgan was the first student from University College Cardiff to be elected to parliament.

He was a party whip in the House of Commons. He served until the Truro constituency was abolished in 1918. For the 1918 General election he tackled a challenge in a new area when he stood as Liberal candidate for Ipswich, however the Coalition Government endorsed his Unionist opponent and he lost badly.

He was however a supporter of David Lloyd George and the Coalition Government and in December 1920 he contested the 1920 Abertillery by-election as a Coalition Liberal candidate against a Labour candidate who successfully defended the seat.

He contested the 1922 general election as National Liberal candidate for Penryn and Falmouth, but finished fourth.

Following Liberal reunion, at the 1923 general election he fought Salford West but came third. This was his last parliamentary election campaign.

Election results

Notes and references

External links 

 

1866 births
1931 deaths
People from Hay-on-Wye
Welsh Baptists
Welsh politicians
Liberal Party (UK) MPs for English constituencies
UK MPs 1906–1910
UK MPs 1910
UK MPs 1910–1918
Members of the Parliament of the United Kingdom for Truro